The Vail–Trust House is a historic building located at 255 Greenbrook Road in Green Brook Township, Somerset County, New Jersey. It was added to the National Register of Historic Places on October 7, 2008, for its significance in architecture.

History
The house site is on an  property that was acquired by Stephen Vail (1710–1777) on May 20, 1747, from the estate of Gideon Mortall. After his death, the property passed to his son, Thomas Vail (–1792). In 1792, it passed to his son, Peter Vail (1764–1842), and is about when the oldest section of the house was built. He sold the property in 1833. After several ownership changes, it was purchased by Herman Trust on February 24, 1866. In 1876, he contracted a carpenter, John Runyon of Dunellen, to build the two-story center section.

Description
The Vail–Trust House has three main sections. The eastern section is the oldest, built , and has a 20th-century Colonial Revival porch. The interior shows Federal style. The center section was built  with Italianate style. The western section is 20th century Colonial Revival.
 
The nearby Wagon House was built in the 19th century.

Gallery

References

External links
 
 

National Register of Historic Places in Somerset County, New Jersey
New Jersey Register of Historic Places
Houses on the National Register of Historic Places in New Jersey
Colonial Revival architecture in New Jersey
Federal architecture in New Jersey
Italianate architecture in New Jersey
Green Brook Township, New Jersey